The 1988 European Espoirs Wrestling Championships was the 9th edition of European Espoirs Wrestling Championships  was held 1988 in Walbrzych , Poland.

Medal table

Medal summary

Men's freestyle

Men's Greco-Roman

References

External links 
 Database

Wrestling
European Espoirs Wrestling Championships
International wrestling competitions hosted by Poland